The Grimsby Peach Kings are a Canadian Junior ice hockey team from Grimsby, Ontario and play in the Provincial Junior Hockey League.

History
One of the oldest hockey clubs in Ontario, the Peach Kings officially joined the Ontario Hockey Association in 1922, however the "Peach Kings" moniker had been used for local sports teams for several decades prior. The name refers to Grimsby's unique ability to cultivate peaches, a fruit that cannot be farmed without proper conditions. Grimsby's location between Lake Ontario and the Niagara Escarpment plus soil types allow for this.

In the early 1920s Col. Roberts had built a large cold storage facility for fruit in the summer that had ample capacity to make ice in the winter. In turn, work began on an arena in the summer of 1921. When the arena opened in January 1922, it was one of only 8 arenas in the world and the Montreal Canadiens soon took advantage of it for their training camp. Shortly after, the professional Saskatoon Sheiks (who were later sold to New York to become the Rangers) also held training camps in Grimsby, and the town became an overnight hockey hotspot.

For the 1924-25 season, sponsors got involved and began scouring Ontario for the best hockey players to play for the Peach Kings. When this squad took to the ice in the fall of 1924, they skated on the same ice as Hall of Famers Howie Morenz, Georges Vézina, and Aurel Joliat skated on for training camp with the Canadiens. With Pud Reid as their captain, they took the league title that year playing against Brantford, Niagara Falls, Welland, Port Colborne, and Dunnville. In the OHA Intermediate A playoffs, the Peach Kings eliminated Paris, Toronto, and New Hamburg on their way to the finals. They beat Kingston in a two-game series to take the OHA championship.

In accordance with the custom of the time, the Intermediate champions would play the previous year's Allan Cup champions, the top senior amateur team in Canada. What was supposed to be a decisive victory for the famous Sault Ste. Marie Greyhounds over Grimsby turned out different. With only 1000 fans watching at Toronto's Mutual St. Arena (the precursor to Maple Leaf Gardens) what was expected to a blowout, the Grimsby upstarts led 3-0 after two periods. The Greyhounds scored twice in the 3rd, but it was not enough as Grimsby held on. This marked the only time in history the Allan Cup titleholders lost to the Intermediates.

From this heralded team, Gerry Carson went on the play for the Montreal Canadiens, Shorty Horne played for the Toronto Maple Leafs, and Pop McVicar, Artie Clark, and Pud Reid all played for the Chicago Cardinals of the American Association.

In 1939-40, the Peach Kings won the OHA Jr. C Final. Featuring Ralph Reid, son of Harry 'Pud' Reid who was captain of the 1925 team, Mush Miller and Red Mason, the Peach Kings defeated Bolton to face Markham in the provincial final. Games were held in Grimsby and the famed Maple Leaf Gardens. They brought home a second provincial championship and won the Clarence Schmalz Cup (however it was yet to be named that).

Returning to Intermediate hockey after World War II, the Peach Kings had more good years. They won their local Fruitbelt League in 1946 and 1947, but lost to Owen Sound in the OHA playoffs in 1946. In 1947, they made it to the OHA finals to play the Markham Millionaires in a best of 5 series. With the Peach Kings leading the series 2-1, the series shifted to Grimsby ice. Fans lined up all afternoon to get into the tiny arena, and eventually over 2000 packed the rink to watch a 3-3 tie after 60 minutes. The 10-minute overtime period was not sudden death like it is today, and Markham scored early. But with less than 2 minutes remaining, Grimsby rookie Barry Blanchard wound up behind his own net, carried the puck down the ice, and dropped it to Norman Warner who evened the score. Then with 39 seconds remaining, William Hutchison put the puck past the Markham goalie to win the Provincial Championship.  Ralph Reid was the captain of the 1947 champions and he is the son of Harry 'Pud' Reid who was the captain of the 1925 Intermediate champions.

The Peach Kings struggled through the 50s, 60s, 70s, and 80s, but almost always retained a team wearing the Peach Kings sweater. Fortunes reversed however when the team was purchased in the mid-1990s and re-emerged as a Jr C team. By 2001, the team was strong claiming 1st place in the league for the 2002-03 season. In the playoffs, they dismissed Dunnville, Dundas, Norwich and the defending Ontario champion Essex 73's on the way to the OHA Finals. Led by captain Dean Davidson and stars Matt Hodges, Kyle Hodges, Biff Fuller, Don Forbes, Ryan Toth, and Josh Horley, the Peach Kings beat Georgina in four games to claim the Provincial "C" Championship for the first time since 1940.

The following year with many of the same players, as well as new ones such as Jay Anderson, Derek Nichols and Steve Foster playing a larger role, the Peach Kings repeated by winning again, this time over Wingham in the Finals. These were the first back-to-back championships in team history. The following year, 2004–05, the Peach Kings made a run for the finals again led by Hodges, Fuller, Toth, Nichols, Anderson, and Foster with newcomers like star goalie Steve Mason, Dan Ellis, Joel Bristo, Joel Agnew, and returnee Scott Clark, the Peach Kings played to the finals again looking to win for a third straight time. Taking a 3-2 series lead over the Essex 73's into the Grimsby Arena, it looked like Grimsby would win again having not lost at home all season. Essex, making their first of five straight Clarence Schmalz Cup Finals appearances, fought back and won Game 6 and Game 7 in Essex and reclaimed the provincial title which Grimsby had held for the previous two years.

At the 2008 IIHF World Junior Hockey Championships, former Peach King goaltender Steve Mason led the Canadian National Team to a fourth straight gold medal. He went 5-0 with a .951 save percentage at the tournament and won various awards: First Team All-Star, Top Goalie in the tournament, as well as MVP of the Tournament.

Grimsby has claimed eight straight Niagara East division titles from 2003 to 2010, ensuring they have finished in the final eight teams in Ontario over this time, only twice (2006 and 2009) not making the semi-finals (final four teams). In the 2010-2011 season the Peach Kings won their fourth Provincial Title, defeating the Belle River Canadiens in the Semi Finals and the defending Ontario Champion Alliston Hornets in the Provincial Finals.

The playoffs for the 2019-20 season were cancelled due to the COVID-19 pandemic, leading to the team not being able to play a single game.

Season-by-season results

Clarence Schmalz Cup appearances
1940: Grimsby Peach Kings defeated Markham Millionaires 3-games-to-2
2003: Grimsby Peach Kings defeated Georgina Ice 4-games-to-none
2004: Grimsby Peach Kings defeated Wingham Ironmen 4-games-to-none
2005: Essex 73's defeated Grimsby Peach Kings 4-games-to-3
2011: Grimsby Peach Kings defeated Alliston Hornets 4-games-to-1
2012: Grimsby Peach Kings defeated Alliston Hornets 4-games-to-1
2019: Napanee Raiders defeated Grimsby Peach Kings 4-games-to-1

Championship Playoffs 2022 
Clarence Schmalz Cup Championships

Notable alumni
Paul Beraldo
Bill Berg
Bill Carson
Gerry Carson
George Horne
Steve Mason
Jay Fielding
Jack McVicar
Dennis Ververgaert
John Scott

References

External links
Peach Kings Homepage
Peach Kings News, Schedule ad Scores

Niagara Junior C Hockey League teams
Grimsby, Ontario
1922 establishments in Ontario
Ice hockey clubs established in 1922